Xiphophorus malinche, also known as highland swordtail, is a live bearing fish in the family Poeciliidae. It is endemic to the Pánuco River basin in east-central Mexico. This species is named after La Malinche, an Indian slave who played a role in the Spanish conquest as the interpreter, secretary, and mistress of Hernando Cortes.

Description
It is a species closely related to X. cortezi and X. birchmanni, with one zigzag horizontal stripe, a well-developed reticulum and males with a prominent bump on their head. It has branched caudal fin rays, a distinctive vertical bar pattern and middorsal spotting. Its sword has a dark ventral pigment and is distinctly upturned. It also possesses a well-formed hook on its gonopodium. Its grave spot is well developed; it has yellow carotenoid pigments.

It has melanophore spotting at the nodes of the reticulum. In X. malinche, females have oval pigmentation blotches. Vertical bar patterns of X. malinche males, however, are very irregular. Many of the bars are of uneven thickness and sometimes slanted. This irregularity varies from fish to fish, and from right to left sides of the same fish.

Behaviour
This species exhibits atypical behavior for swordtails of the montezumae or cortezi groups. In other species of these groups, mature males are usually found darting among and underneath rocks. Males (and females) of X. malinche were found in a shallow, sunny, sand-bottomed river under floating aquatic vegetation. It is known to hybridise with X. birchmanni.

Distribution
This species is restricted to several tributaries of the Pánuco River basin in Mexico: Rio Claro, Rio Moctezuma drainage, Rio Calnali, Rio Conzintla, Rio Atlapexco drainage, Arroyo Soyatla and Rio Calabozo drainage.

References

Further reading
Reproductive behaviour: 
Genus information:

External links
ADW entry
EOL entry

malinche
Taxa named by Mary Rauchenberger
Taxa named by Klaus D. Kallman
Taxa named by Donald Charles Morizot
Fish described in 1990